Justin D. Fox (born 4 May 1967) is a South African author, photojournalist, lecturer and editor living in Cape Town, South Africa. He was editor of Getaway travel magazine until 2020, and has freelanced internationally for many newspapers and magazines. Educated at SACS junior and high schools, he graduated from the University of Cape Town with a BA in English in 1990. He was elected as a Rhodes Scholar in 1991 and graduated with a masters and a doctorate in English from Oxford University. He is the author of more than a dozen books, ranging from travel and children's literature to photography and fiction.

Fox's book The Impossible Five named South Africa's most elusive animals, including the Cape mountain leopard, the aardvark, the ground pangolin, the white lion, and the riverine rabbit. They are almost impossible to track in the wild, and spotting one in the wild is considered a major accomplishment.

Awards and honours
 1991 elected Rhodes Scholar to Oxford University
 1999 Winner of a Mondi Award for journalism			
 2004 Winner of a Mondi Award for journalism
 2006 JM Coetzee PEN short-story award, third place
 2009 PICA Travel Writer of the Year Award, runner up
 2011 Alan Paton Award for non-fiction longlist for The Marginal Safari
 2012 Olive Schreiner Prize for literature longlist for The Marginal Safari
 2012 PICA Travel Writer of the Year (runner up)
 2012 ANFASA bursary for non-fiction writing
 2014 Etisalat Prize for Literature longlist for Whoever Fears the Sea
 2014 Patricia Schonstein ‘Poetry in McGregor Award', winner

Bibliography

Books
 The Cape Raider
 The 30-Year Safari
 My Great Expedition
 Mijn Kleine Safari
 Secret Cape Town
 The Impossible Five
 The Hobbsian Line
 Whoever Fears the Sea: A Novel
 African Epic: The Untamed Mountain-Bike Race
 The Marginal Safari: Scouting the Edge of South Africa
 Africa Lens: 20 years of Getaway Photography
 Cape Town Calling
 Under the Sway: a Photographic Journey Through Mozambique
 Just Add Dust: Overland from Cape to Cairo
 The Best of Getaway Gallery
 With Both Hands Waving
 The Life and Art of François Krige
 Revel Fox: Reflections on the Making of Space

References

External links

 
 Justin Fox – Whoever Fears The Sea (2013)
 The Impossible Five
 Travel Writing with Justin Fox

1967 births
Living people
South African journalists
South African writers
South African editors
South African magazine editors
University of Cape Town alumni
Alumni of the University of Oxford